Carnalea railway station is located in the townland of Carnalea in northwest Bangor, County Down, Northern Ireland.

It was first opened by the B.C.D.R. (Belfast and County Down Railway) on its present site at Station Walk on 1 June 1877 with only an up platform, and a brake van as an office.

Through the advent of wooden villas in the late 19th century, the B.C.D.R. (Belfast and County Down Railway) built a station house on the upside in 1897, most of which still stands. The station master's former dwelling is the oldest building in the area.

The station's low-set signal cabin (disused since the 1930s) and downside shelter have been demolished since the Northern Ireland Railways takeover in 1967. Glass shelters exist on the sites of the former waiting areas.

The station remains popular and many locals commute to Belfast via the station each morning.

Service

Extra services operate at peak times, and the service reduces to hourly operation in the evenings. Certain peak-time express trains will pass through Carnalea station without stopping.

On Sundays there is an hourly service in each direction.

References

Railway stations in County Down
Bangor, County Down
Railway stations opened in 1877
Railway stations served by NI Railways
1877 establishments in Ireland
Railway stations in Northern Ireland opened in the 19th century